On September 18th 1972, a letter bomb mailed from Amsterdam killed Ami Shchori, 44, the Israeli agriculture attaché at the Israeli embassy in London.

The attack was one of the numerous murder-by-mail attacks carried out worldwide against Israelis and Jews by militant Black September Palestinian commandos. 40 letter bombs were sent to Israeli and American diplomats, although Shchori was the only fatality.

References 

Attacks in 1972
Attacks in the United Kingdom
Attacks on diplomatic missions in the United Kingdom
Assassinated Israeli diplomats
Terrorism in London
Israeli terrorism victims
Palestinian terrorism
Attacks on diplomatic missions of Israel
1972 murders in the United Kingdom
Terrorist incidents in the United Kingdom in 1972
Deaths by letter bomb